Marais (meaning "marsh") may refer to:

People
 Marais (given name)
 Marais (surname)

Other uses
 Le Marais, historic district of Paris
 Théâtre du Marais, the name of several theatres and theatrical troupes in Paris, France
 Marais (company), a heavy equipment manufacturer based in Durtal, France
 Marais, also known as The Plain, a political group during the French Revolution
 Marais, Louisiana, a fictional town in the 2019 TV series Swamp Thing

See also
 
 Grand Marais (disambiguation)
 Little Marais (disambiguation)
 Marai (disambiguation)
 Marais des Cygnes (disambiguation)
 Desmarais